Draxeni or Drăxeni may refer to:

Drăxeni, a village in Gherghești Commune, Vaslui County, Romania
Draxeni, a village in Rebricea Commune, Vaslui County, Romania